Megan Elizabeth Clark  is an Australian geologist and business executive, former director of the CSIRO, and former head of the Australian Space Agency.

Early life and education 
Clark was educated at Presbyterian Ladies' College. Clark was awarded a BSc (Hons) in Economic Geology at the University of Western Australia in 1981, and a Doctorate in Economic Geology at Queen's University, Kingston, Ontario in 1987.

Career
She began her career as a mine geologist and subsequently worked in mineral exploration, mine geology, R&D management, venture capital and technical strategy areas with Western Mining Corporation. Clark also worked in a corporate venture fund with Advent International in Boston.

She was then a director of N M Rothschild & Sons (Australia) and was Vice-president Technology and subsequently Vice-president Health, Safety, Environment, Community and Sustainability with BHP Billiton from 2003 to 2008.

Clark was a member of the prime minister's Science, Engineering and Innovation Council, as well as the prime minister's Taskforce on Manufacturing. She is also a commissioner on the Commission on Sustainable Agriculture and Climate Change, a fellow of the Australian Academy of Technological Sciences and Engineering and a fellow of the Australian Institute of Company Directors.

In 2009 she was appointed Chief Executive of the Commonwealth Scientific and Industrial Research Organisation (CSIRO), making her its first female chief executive. Under her leadership CSIRO was credited for a number of new ventures, including wireless research.

Since 2014, she has been a non-executive director of Rio Tinto Limited.
As a Rio Tinto board member, she began serving as chairman of the Sustainability Committee in May 2016, and has become a member of the Remuneration Committee with effect from 1 May 2016.

Clark was one of the Directors of Rio Tinto in May 2020 when the mining company deliberately destroyed the Australian Aboriginal sacred site at Juukan Gorge – the only inland site in Australia to show signs of continuous human occupation for over 46,000 years. Ten months after the event, and following a significant protest vote against Clark, with more than a quarter of shareholders voting against her re-election, she admitted to feeling regret, saying "it is hard to even explain the level of hurt and shame that we feel and the shame that I personally feel." The Rio Tinto board noted in response to the vote that "Rio Tinto acknowledges that the reduced vote for Dr Clark's re-election compared to previous years reflects the fact that, as chair of the Sustainability Committee at the time that the rock shelters at Juukan Gorge were destroyed, Dr Clark shares accountability for the failings in the areas of communities and social performance that led to those events occurring."

On 14 May 2018, it was announced that she would head the Australian Space Agency, after leading the 2017 review into Australia's space capabilities.

Awards
In the 2014 Queen's Birthday Honours List, Clark was appointed a Companion of the Order of Australia (AC), for "eminent service to scientific research and development through fostering innovation, to science administration through strategic leadership roles, and to the development of public policy for technological sciences".

Personal life
Clark is married to Trent Hutchinson who is also a graduate of Queens University.

References

1958 births
Australian geologists
People from Perth, Western Australia
People educated at Presbyterian Ladies' College, Perth
University of Western Australia alumni
Queen's University at Kingston alumni
Companions of the Order of Australia
Fellows of the Australian Academy of Technological Sciences and Engineering
CSIRO people
Australian public servants
Living people
Fellows of the Australian Institute of Company Directors
Australian women geologists